Per Tage Gustafsson (born June 4, 1970) is a Swedish former professional ice hockey defenceman. He played over 700 games for HV71 in the Swedish Elitserien between 1988 and 2010, winning the championship three times. He also played 89 games in the National Hockey League for Florida Panthers, Toronto Maple Leafs and Ottawa Senators, between 1996 and 1998. Internationally he played for the Swedish national team in several tournaments, including the 1996 and 2003 World Championships, winning a silver in the latter.

Playing career 
Gustafsson was drafted in the 1994 NHL Entry Draft by Florida Panthers with their 11th pick, 261st overall. He played two seasons, 1996–97 and 1997–98, in the NHL and American Hockey League. Playing for Florida Panthers, Toronto Maple Leafs and Ottawa Senators, he totalled 89 games for 35 points (8 goals and 27 assists).

He played for HV71 for 20 seasons and was one of the best defencemen in the club's history. He has the club record for most played regular season and playoff games.

In 1991–92 season Gustafsson scored a goal against Luleå HF just after six seconds, which as of 2008 was the Elitserien's record for fastest goal.

International play 
Gustafsson made his debut in the Swedish national team on April 12, 1992, in Moscow in a match against the Russian national team. He played for Sweden in the 1996 World Championships and 2003 World Championships, where he won a silver medal.

Awards and achievements 
 Swedish Champion with HV71 in 1995, 2004 and 2008.
 Named to the Swedish All-Star Team in 1996 and 2004.
 Silver medal at the 2003 World Championship.
 Played in the Elitserien All-Star Game in 2000 and 2001.
 Elitserien playoff silver medal with HV71 in 2009.

Records 
 HV71's club defenceman record for seasons (16)
 HV71's club defenceman record for played playoffs (10)
 HV71's club defenceman record for playoff games (72)
 HV71's club defenceman record for goals in playoffs (13)
 HV71's club defenceman record for assists in playoffs (25)
 HV71's club defenceman record for points in playoffs (38)
 HV71's club defenceman record for power play goals in playoffs (8)
 HV71's club defenceman record for goals in one game, 1991-92 (3)
 Elitserien record for fastest goal, 1991-92 (6 seconds)
 HV71's club defenceman record for goals in one playoff, 1994-95 (7)
 HV71's club defenceman record for points in one playoff, 1994-95 (12)
 HV71's club defenceman record for power play goals in one playoff, 1994-95 (5)
 HV71's club defenceman record for goals in regular season, 1998-99 (12)
 HV71's club defenceman record for power play goals in regular season, 1998-99 (7)

Career statistics

Regular season and playoffs

International

References

External links
 

1970 births
Living people
Florida Panthers draft picks
Florida Panthers players
HV71 players
Ice hockey players with retired numbers
Ottawa Senators players
People from Oskarshamn Municipality
St. John's Maple Leafs players
Sportspeople from Kalmar County
Swedish expatriate ice hockey players in Canada
Swedish expatriate ice hockey players in the United States
Swedish ice hockey defencemen
Toronto Maple Leafs players